The 1976–77 Ranji Trophy was the 43rd season of the Ranji Trophy. Bombay's won their third consecutive title defeating Delhi. This was their 18th win in 19 years.

Group stage

North Zone

South Zone

West Zone

Central Zone

East Zone

Knockout stage

Final

Scorecards and averages
Cricketarchive

References

External links

1977 in Indian cricket
Domestic cricket competitions in 1976–77
Ranji Trophy seasons